Irfan Ali is a retired Pakistani civil servant who served in BPS-22 grade (highest attainable rank for a serving officer) as Federal Secretary. Irfan belongs to the Pakistan Administrative Service and joined the civil service in 1986.

Career
Irfan Ali served as the Power Secretary of Pakistan, appointed to the post by Prime Minister Imran Khan in August 2018 and remained in office till June 2020. Before joining the Power Division, he served as the Federal Secretary for Privatisation Division. He has also served as Chairman, Chief Minister’s Inspection Team (CMIT), Lahore.

See also
 Government of Pakistan

References

Pakistani civil servants
Government of Pakistan
Pakistani government officials
Year of birth missing (living people)
Living people